Dropdown or drop-down may refer to:
 Drop-down list
Drop-down curtain